The deputy prime minister of the Netherlands is the official deputy of the head of government of the Netherlands. In the absence of the prime minister of the Netherlands the deputy prime minister takes over his functions, such as chairing the Cabinet of the Netherlands and the Council of Ministers of the Netherlands. Conventionally, all of the junior partners in the coalition get one deputy, and the deputies are ranked according to the size of their respective parties. The incumbent deputy prime ministers are Sigrid Kaag of the Democrats 66 serving as Minister of Finance, Wopke Hoekstra of the Christian Democratic Appeal serving as Minister of Foreign Affairs and Carola Schouten of the Christian Union serving as Minister for Welfare and Civic Engagement.

List of unofficial deputy prime ministers of the Netherlands

List of deputy prime ministers of the Netherlands

Living deputy prime ministers of the Netherlands

Deputy prime ministers of the Netherlands by term length

References

 
Dutch political institutions